The Pop Cola Panthers were a professional basketball team that played in the Philippine Basketball Association from 1990-2001. The franchise was owned by RFM Corporation. In 2001, when RFM Corporation sold its entire stake in Cosmos Bottling Corporation to Coca-Cola Bottlers Philippines, Inc. (CCBPI), the PBA franchise was included in the transaction.  Upon ownership by CCBPI, the PBA franchise renamed the Coca-Cola Tigers beginning the 2002 PBA season and was considered as an expansion team.

The franchise also played under the names Pop Cola/Diet Sarsi Sizzlers, Swift Mighty Meaty Hotdogs, Swift Mighty Meaties, Sunkist Orange Juicers/Bottlers and Pop Cola 800s.

History
Pop Cola was one of two expansion franchises to enter the league in the 1990 season, joining softdrink rival Pepsi-Cola, increasing the number of member teams in the pro league to eight.

In their 12-year stint in the PBA, they were known as the Pop Cola Sizzlers, Sarsi, Swift Mighty Meaty, Sunkist Orange Juicers, Sunkist Orange Bottlers and Pop Cola 800s. The team has used the Pop Cola name from 1997 until their final season in the PBA in 2001, although the team was known as Sunkist in the 2000 Commissioners Cup and was known as the Swift Panthers for the first few games of the 2001 Governors Cup. Their first finals appearance came in 1991 All-Filipino, as Diet Sarsi, lost to corporate rival Purefoods TJ Hotdogs, 3 games to 2 in a Best of Five finals series. The team's first PBA title came in 1992, when Swift defeated 7-Up four games-to-none to win the PBA Third Conference under head coach Yeng Guiao.

The franchise also fielded one of the dominant imports in PBA history in Tony Harris, who scored a PBA record 105 points for Swift when they defeated Ginebra 151-147 in a game held in Iloilo City on October 10, 1992.

In 1993, Swift traded Jack Tanuan, Ricric Marata and Andy De Guzman for Sta. Lucia in exchange for their former players in their PABL days, Vergel Meneses and Zaldy Realubit, and this gave Swift its second championship in the newly called Commissioners Cup, gaining revenge over their business rival, Purefoods Oodles, 4 games to 2, the Hotdogs were powered by best import Ronnie Thompkins. the team was title-less the following season in which head coach Yeng Guiao decided to moved over to Pepsi Mega, and Derek Pumaren taking over the coaching chores, Swift made it to the finals in the season-ending Governor's Cup, losing to Alaska in six games.

The 1995 season became a banner year for the team. Under the name Sunkist Orange Juicers, the team almost achieved a rare back-to-back winning the All-Filipino and Commissioner's Cup titles before finishing third overall in the season-ending Governor's Cup. The team was bannered by season MVP Vergel Meneses, Bonel Balingit, Boybits Victoria, Kenneth Duremdes and Rudy Distrito (who was banned in 1995 for his infamous hard foul on Alaska rookie Jeffrey Cariaso during the All-Filipino finals series).

Sunkist/Pop Cola suffered hard times in the 1996 and 1997 seasons before their fortunes changed in 1998 when the team won a few third-place finishes under head coach Norman Black, who even played one game during the Commissioner's Cup to lead the 800s to a third-place finish in the said tournament.

Pop Cola suffered two more losing seasons in 1999 and 2000 seasons but had a decent run in their final PBA season in 2001 under head coach Chot Reyes, copping third place honors in the All-Filipino Conference.

The franchise ended when RFM Corporation sold its PBA franchise to Coca-Cola Bottlers Philippines, Inc. (CCBPI), in connection to its sale of Cosmos Bottling Corporation to CCBPI in 2001.

Season-by-season records

Awards

Individual awards

PBA Press Corps Individual Awards

All-Star Weekend

Notable players

PBA's 25 greatest players
 Ato Agustin - "The Atomic Bomb"
 Johnny Abarrientos #14 - "The Flying A"
 Kenneth Duremdes - "Captain Marbel"
 Bernie Fabiosa #51 - "The Sultan of Swipe" played his final year in the league with the team in 1991.
 Jojo Lastimosa - "Jolas"
 Vergel Meneses - "The Aerial Voyager"

Other notable players

William Antonio
Nelson Asaytono
Bonel Balingit
Nic Belasco
Sonny Cabatu
Andy De Guzman
Rudy Distrito
Boyet Fernandez
Pido Jarencio
Dwight Lago
Joey Loyzaga
Ric-Ric Marata
Ali Peek
Zaldy Realubit
Elmer Reyes
Eric Reyes
Terry Saldaña
Al Solis
Jack Tanuan
Boybits Victoria
Elpidio Villamin

Imports

Michael Anderson
Dexter Boney
David Booth
Marques Bragg
Norris Coleman
Jevon Crudup
Jay Edwards
Harold Ellis
Rosell Ellis
Sherell Ford
Tremaine Fowlkes
Paul Graham
Ronnie Grandison
Sean Green
Tony Harris
Shawn Harvey
David Henderson
Sean Higgins
Byron Houston
Alfredrick Hughes
Herb Jones
Marcus Liberty
Lewis Lloyd
Cedric McCullough
Lester Neal
Victor Page
Galen Robinson
Stan Rose
Kenny Sanders
Jason Sasser
Stevin Smith
Carl Thomas
Ronnie Thompkins
Bernard Thompson
Marcus Timmons
Kelvin Upshaw
Jamie Watson
Bryatt Vann

References

 
Basketball teams established in 1990
Basketball teams disestablished in 2001
Defunct Philippine Basketball Association teams
San Miguel Corporation
1990 establishments in the Philippines
2001 disestablishments in the Philippines